Shahzan Muda Football Club is a Malaysian football club based in Kuantan, Pahang. The club currently plays at the Malaysia FAM League, the third tier of the Malaysian football league.

Achievements

Management and coaching staff

 Manager: Wan Kamarul Nahar Wan Mustapha
 Assistant manager: Noraishah Ahmad
 Head coach: Tajuddin Nor
 Assistant head coach: Bahazenan Othman
 Goalkeeping coach: Abdul Samad Mat Salleh
 Physio: Mohd Riduan Amin

Players

Transfers

For recent transfers, see List of Malaysian football transfers 2017 and List of Malaysian football transfers summer 2016

Managers

Coaches

Affiliated clubs
 Pahang FA
 Kuantan FA

References

External links
 Shahzan Muda SC Facebook Page

Malaysia FAM League clubs
Football clubs in Malaysia